Pyrausta silhetalis is a moth in the family Crambidae. It was described by Achille Guenée in 1854. It is found in Bangladesh, India (Silhet, Himalaya, Hindustan) and Kashmir.

References

Moths described in 1854
silhetalis
Moths of Asia